Hässelby gård metro station is a station on the Green line of the Stockholm metro. It is located in the district of Hässelby gård, which is part of the borough of Hässelby-Vällingby in the west of the city of Stockholm. The station is elevated and has a single island platform, with access from a lower level station building on Hässelby torg.

A temporary station at Hässelby gård was inaugurated on 1 November 1956 as the western end of an extension from Vällingby. This was replaced by the current station on 15 October 1958, and on the 18th of the following month the line was extended further west to Hässelby strand. The station was renovated in 2011.

Gallery

References

Green line (Stockholm metro) stations
Railway stations opened in 1956
1956 establishments in Sweden